NOLA is the debut studio album by American sludge metal band Down, released on September 19, 1995 by EastWest Records. The title is the abbreviation for New Orleans (NO), Louisiana (LA).

Production

Writing and recording

NOLA was written mainly by Phil Anselmo and Pepper Keenan between 1990 and 1995. Throughout 1991 to 1993, the band released three demos, a three-track demo (1991), a four-track demo (1992), and a ten-track demo (1993). Originally, the band made the three-track demo for underground trading. The demo featured the tracks "Losing All", "Temptation's Wings", and "Bury Me in Smoke". In an effort to build a fan base, the band would ask heavy metal fans if they had ever "heard of this band, Down" and hand them copies of the tape without telling the person that they were in the band. In 1992, the band recorded a second demo, this time featuring the same track listing as the original but with an intro. In 1993, the band made the Demo Collection 1992–1993 which is a ten-track demo featuring all the songs that would make the album cut except "Rehab", "Pray for the Locust", and "Underneath Everything". Anselmo solely wrote only three songs on the album ("Hail the Leaf", "Pray for the Locust", and "Pillars of Eternity"). Eventually, the original demo tape was distributed throughout the United States and Down played a small concert in its home town. A record executive from EastWest Records was attending the show. When he found out who the members of the band were, he signed Down to a recording contract. The band began recording the album in the summer of 1994 at the Ultrasonic Studios, New Orleans, Louisiana, and completed the recording sessions by January 1995.

Artwork
The booklet art is by Jim DeBarros and David Manteau and makes extensive use of vintage photographs by Clarence John Laughlin.

Lyrics and style
Although a sludge metal album, NOLA contains traces of hardcore punk, southern rock, stoner rock, and grunge. Lyrical themes on the album prominently focus on topics such as death, suicide, drug use and personal struggles.

Track listing

Release and reception

Commercial performance
NOLA was released in September 1995 and would peak at number 57 in October 1995 on the Billboard 200, and remain on the chart for six weeks. The album spawned four singles in "Stone the Crow", "Lifer", "Temptation's Wings", which were released in 1995, and "Bury Me in Smoke" in 1996. However, only "Stone the Crow" would achieve commercial success when it reached number 40 on the Mainstream Rock Tracks charts, becoming Down's first and only top 40 song.

Critical reception

The album received positive reviews from critics with Allmusic reviewer David Reamer giving the album a near perfect 4.5 out of 5 stars. He praised the songs "Temptation's Wings", "Stone the Crow", and "Bury Me in Smoke" stating "this is a landmark album that combines the talents of dedicated rock musicians, and should be included in any collection of heavy metal music."

Tour
Down supported NOLA with a 13-date concert tour. The band went on hiatus in 1996 as all members continued their main projects. They would reunite in 1999 to make a second album, Down II, released in 2002.

Tour dates

Personnel

Down
 Philip Anselmo – vocals, mandolin (track 8), guitar (track 11)
 Pepper Keenan – guitars
 Kirk Windstein – guitars, bass*
 Jimmy Bower – drums
 Todd Strange – bass*
Although Todd Strange is credited as bass in all of the credits on each release, Kirk Windstein played the instrument in the studio. Strange still contributed to some songwriting, and also played live.

Additional musicians
 Lil' Daddy – percussion (track 8), water pipe (track 5)
 Sid Montz – percussion (track 8)
 Ross Karpelman – keyboards (track 8)

Technical personnel
 Matt Thomas – production, mixing
 David Farrell – mixing
 Ted Jensen – mastering
 Clarence John Laughlin – photography
 Michael Miller – photography
 Atom Bomb – photography

Chart positions
Album – Billboard (United States)

Singles – Billboard (United States)

References

Down (band) albums
1995 debut albums
Elektra Records albums